Sarah Jacquelyn Luebbert (born December 16, 1997) is an American professional soccer player who plays as a forward for Liga MX Femenil side Club América.

Club career

Chicago Red Stars
Luebbert made her NWSL debut in the 2020 NWSL Challenge Cup on July 1, 2020.

References

External links
 Sarah Luebbert at University of Missouri
 Sarah Luebbert at Chicago Red Stars
 Sarah Luebbert at Club América Femenil 
 
 
 
 
 

1997 births
Living people
American women's soccer players
Soccer players from Missouri
Sportspeople from Jefferson City, Missouri
Women's association football forwards
Missouri Tigers women's soccer players
Chicago Red Stars players
Club América (women) footballers
Liga MX Femenil players